Vietato morire is the second studio album by Albanian-Italian singer-songwriter Ermal Meta, released in Italy on 10 February 2017 by Mescal and distributed by Artist First.

It is a double album, which includes Meta's previous full-length record, Umano, and an additional disc featuring 9 new tracks, also including a duet with Italian singer-songwriter Elisa.
The album was preceded by the single with the same title, which was released on 7 February 2017 and competed in the 67th Sanremo Music Festival, placing third in the main competition and receiving the Critics' Prize "Mia Martini".

After debuting at number five on the Italian FIMI Albums Chart, the album reached number one in its second week, on 24 February 2017.

Track listing

Charts

Certifications

References

2017 albums
Italian-language albums
Ermal Meta albums